Federal Highway 74 (Carretera Federal 74) (Fed. 74) is a toll-free part of the federal highway corridors (los corredores carreteros federales) of Mexico. The entire length of the highway is within Nayarit.

References

074